Living Apart: Communal violence and forced displacement in Muzaffarnagar and Shamli is a book describing the violence and the aftermath of the 2013 Muzaffarnagar riots in Uttar Pradesh, India. Written by social activists Harsh Mander, Akram Akhtar Chaudhary, Zafar Eqbal, and Rajanya Bose, it is based on interviews with people who witnessed the violence, and describes the living conditions of such people.

Commenting on the content of the book, Mander has written:

Reviews

The Hindu
The Hindu describes the book as a "field report" which

Asian Age
A review in The Asian Age states that the book chronicles the apathy of the state government in rehabilitating the victims of the Muzaffarnagar riots. Commenting on the violence that took place, the review quotes from a passage in the book:

The Telegraph
A  review in The Telegraph states that the report aims to draw the attention of the state government to the riots. The review states that, as per the report, some Muslim community organisations, who offered to help to victims would only do so on certain conditions, including "adherence to more orthodox beliefs." The review quotes the report:

References

Muzaffarnagar riots, 2013
Muzaffarnagar riots, 2013
History of Uttar Pradesh (1947–present)
Muzaffarnagar district
Muzaffarnagar riots, 2013
Muzaffarnagar riots, 2013
2013 Muzaffarnagar violence